Vaijanath Sangappa Patil (29 July 1938 – 2 November 2019) was an Indian politician and social worker who was the Minister of state for  Minister of Urban Development (excluding Bangalore) of Karnataka from 1994 to 1999. He was also Minister of Horticulture of Karnataka from 1984 to 1989.

Early life and education
Patil was born on 29 July 1938 in agricultural family at Hakyala village of Aurad taluk Bidar district. He completed his BA from BVB degree college Bidar, and LLB from SSL law college in Gulbarga. For his service to society Gulbarga University conferred an honorary doctorate upon him during its 31st Annual Convocation.

Politics
He served as Minister for Horticulture in the Ramakrishna Hegde government in 1984 and as Urban Development Minister in the Deve Gowda government in 1994. Vaijnath Patil was elected MLA from Chincholi constituency two times and MLC from Gulbarga constituency.

References

1938 births
2019 deaths
People from Kalaburagi district
Karnataka MLAs 1994–1999
Indian National Congress politicians from Karnataka
Bharatiya Janata Party politicians from Karnataka
Janata Dal politicians
Janata Dal (Secular) politicians
Karnataka MLAs 2004–2007